Sandra Milovanoff (born Alexandrine Aleksejevna Milovanova, 23 June 1892 – 8 May 1957), also known as Sandra Milovanov, was a Russian-French actress known for her roles in French cinema during the silent era.

Biography
Alexandrine Aleksejevna Milovanova was born on 23 June 1892 into a bourgeois family, the daughter of Aleksej Milovanov and Marija Milovanova (née Smirnova).

Milovanova attended the Tchiszakoff Dance School in St. Petersburg from 1900 to 1908. She became a member of Anna Pavlova's dance troupe, and, two years later, she became a part of Sergei Diaghilev's Ballets Russes, and toured across Europe. While performing in London, World War I broke out, and the company found themselves stranded there.

In 1916, Milovanova returned to Russia, and was hired at the Nicholas II Theater. The October Revolution forced Milovanova to flee from Russia to Monte Carlo, where she planned to continue her work in the Ballets Russes. Instead, director René Navarre took notice of her, and Milovanova signed a contract with Gaumont Film Company, making her film debut in La p'tite du sixième (1917) as Sandra Milovanoff.

Louis Feuillade became fascinated by Milovanoff, and she next starred in Feuillade's film serial The Two Girls (1921) alongside Olinda Mano and Violette Jyl, followed by L'orpheline (1921), and Parisette (1921).  Milovanoff became a very famous actress throughout France, and was ranked only second to Mary Pickford on a popularity scale in a magazine.

After her contract with Gaumont expired, Jacques de Baroncelli began managing her career. She then starred in The Legend of Sister Beatrix (1923), Nène (1924), which she received praise for her performance in, The Phantom of the Moulin Rouge (1925), directed by René Clair, Les Misérables (1925), and The Prey of the Wind (1926), which asserted her as a tragedienne.

After starring in Mauprat (1926), directed by Jean Epstein, Milovanoff's career took off internationally. In Germany, she played a supporting role in Make Up (1927) with Marcella Albani and Werner Krauss, in Sweden she acted in Gustaf Molander's Sealed Lips (1927), and La Condesa María (1928) in Spain.

With the advent of sound, Milovanoff's career began to falter, as her Slavic accent was considered unsuitable for talkies. She made only one film in the 1930s, Dans la nuit (1930), in which she played Charles Vanel's wife. She attempted to resume her career as a dancer, but by this time was too old. She married for a second time to Maurice de Moolek, with whom she had a daughter.

She returned to film in the 1940s, appearing in Après Mein Kampf, mes crimes (1940), The Last Judgment (1945), and The Private Life of an Actor (1948). She made her final screen appearance in Ils ont vingt ans (1950).

Milovanoff remarried a third time to makeup artist Joseph Mejinsky, and died in Paris on 8 May 1957. She is buried at Cimetière parisien de Pantin.

Filmography

References

Bibliography
 Celia McGerr. René Clair. Twayne Publishers, 1980.

External links

1892 births
1957 deaths
French film actresses

Actresses from the Russian Empire
White Russian emigrants to France
People who emigrated to escape Bolshevism
Dancers from Saint Petersburg
20th-century French actresses